The Stadion Classic at UGA was a golf tournament on the Web.com Tour. Founded in 2006 as the Athens Regional Foundation Classic, it was played at Jennings Mill Country Club in Bogart, Georgia from 2006 to 2009 and at the University of Georgia Golf Course in Athens, Georgia from 2010 to 2013. Three of the four editions held at the university course were won by former or active members of the school's golf team.

The 2013 purse was $600,000, with $108,000 for first place.

Winners

Bolded golfers graduated to the PGA Tour via the Web.com Tour regular-season money list.

Notes

External links

Coverage on the Web.com Tour's official site

Former Korn Ferry Tour events
Golf in Georgia (U.S. state)
Recurring sporting events established in 2006
Recurring sporting events disestablished in 2013
2006 establishments in Georgia (U.S. state)
2013 disestablishments in Georgia (U.S. state)